The Montreal Canadiens centennial was celebrated by the Montreal Canadiens ice hockey team during its 2008–09 and 2009–10 seasons, commemorating the 100th Anniversary of the founding of the National Hockey League's most successful club. The 2009 NHL All-Star Game was played at Bell Centre in Montreal, Quebec as part of the celebrations, and the 2009 NHL Entry Draft was held there in late June.

On April 5, 2008, the logo for the 2009 NHL All-Star Game was unveiled in Montreal.

Retiring of uniform numbers
As part of its centennial anniversary celebrations, the Canadiens organization retired the following uniform numbers:
 2005–06: Dickie Moore, Yvan Cournoyer (number 12); Bernard "Boom Boom" Geoffrion (number 5)
 2006–07: Serge Savard (number 18); Ken Dryden (number 29)
 2007–08: Larry Robinson (number 19); Bob Gainey (number 23)
 2008–09: Patrick Roy (number 33)
 2009–10: Elmer Lach (number 16); Emile Bouchard (number 3)

Centennial events and initiatives
On September 24, 2008, the Canadiens held a press conference to announce all the events the team is holding:
 A set of commemorative dollar coins to be minted by the Royal Canadian Mint.
 A set of commemorative stamps to be issued by Canada Post.
 A set of 200 Upper Deck anniversary cards.
 Canadiens Monopoly
 Centennial jersey nights when the team will wear historic jerseys of the past during NHL games.
 Builder's night honoring past coaches.
 Opening of the 'Centennial Plaza' outside of the Bell Centre.
 Original Six salutes — when "original six" teams visit the Canadiens.
 Opening of a community outdoor rink.
 A concert by the Montreal Symphony Orchestra, which is celebrating its 75th anniversary.
 A movie, Pour toujours, les Canadiens!
 EA Sports' NHL 09 video game including the 'Centennial Montreal Canadiens', a special team of the top players ever part of the Canadiens franchise

On opening night, the Canadiens organization unveiled the Ring of Honour in the Bell Centre. It consists of an exhibit of all players and builders of the Montreal Canadiens currently in the Hockey Hall of Fame, placed at the back walls of the arena's upper deck.
On December 4, 2009, the Montreal Canadiens played a "centennial game" on the 100th anniversary of their induction as a professional hockey organization. They played the Boston Bruins and won by a score of 5-1.  Michael Cammalleri scored his second hat-trick of the season that night for the Canadiens.

See also
2008–09 Montreal Canadiens season
2009–10 Montreal Canadiens season

Notes

References
 

Centennial Year
2009–10 NHL season